The triangular theory of love is a theory of love developed by Robert Sternberg. In the context of interpersonal relationships, "the three components of love, according to the triangular theory, are an intimacy component, a passion component, and a decision/commitment component."

Sternberg says that intimacy refers to "feelings of closeness, connectedness, and bondedness in loving relationships," passion refers to "the drives that lead to romance, physical attraction, sexual consummation, and related phenomena in loving relationships" and decision/commitment means different things in the short and long term. In the short-term, it refers to "the decision that one loves a certain other", and in the long-term, it refers to "one's commitment to maintain that love."

Components
The three components of love as described in the theory are as follows:

Passion 
Passion can be associated with either physical arousal or emotional stimulation. Passion is defined in three ways:

 A strong feeling of enthusiasm or excitement for something or about doing something
 A strong feeling (such as anger) that causes people to act in a dangerous way
 Strong sexual or romantic feeling for someone

Intimacy 
Intimacy is described as the feelings of closeness and attachment to one another. This tends to strengthen the tight bond that is shared between those two individuals. Additionally, having a sense of intimacy helps create the feeling of being at ease with one another, in the sense that the two parties are mutual in their feelings.

Intimacy is primarily defined as something of a personal or private nature; familiarity.

Commitment 
Unlike the other two blocks, commitment involves a conscious decision to stick with one another. The decision to remain committed is mainly determined by the level of satisfaction that a partner derives from the relationship. There are three ways to define commitment:

 A promise to do or give something.
 A promise to be loyal to someone or something.
 The attitude of someone who works very hard to do or support something.

"The amount of love one experiences depends on the absolute strength of these three components, and the type of love one experiences depends on their strengths relative to each other." Different stages and types of love can be explained as different combinations of these three elements; for example, the relative emphasis of each component changes over time as an adult romantic relationship develops. A relationship based on a single element is less likely to survive than one based on two or three elements.

Influences

Of the multiple different early and later theories of love, there are two specific early theories that contribute to and influence Sternberg's theory.

The first is a theory presented by Zick Rubin named The Theory of Liking vs. Loving. In his theory, to define romantic love, Rubin concludes that attachment, caring, and intimacy are the three main principles that are key to the difference of liking one person and loving them. Rubin states that if a person simply enjoys another's presence and spending time with them, that person only likes the other. However, if a person shares a strong desire for intimacy and contact, as well as cares equally about the other's needs and their own, the person loves the other. In Sternberg's theory, one of his main principles is intimacy. It is clear that intimacy is an important aspect of love, ultimately using it to help define the difference between compassionate and passionate love.

The second, presented by John Lee, is the color wheel model of love. In his theory, using the analogy of primary colors to love, Lee defines the three different styles of love: Eros, Ludos, and Storge. Most importantly within his theory, he concludes that these three primary styles, like the making of complementary colors, can be combined to make secondary forms of love. In Sternberg's theory, he presents, like Lee, that through the combination of his three main principles, different forms of love are created.

Sternberg also described three models of love, including the Spearmanian, Thomsonian, and Thurstonian models. According to the Spearmanian model, love is a single bundle of positive feelings. In the Thomsonian model, love is a mixture of multiple feeling that, when brought together, produce the feeling. The Thurstonian model is the closest to the triangular theory of love, and posits that love is made up of a set of feelings of approximately equal importance that are best understood on their own rather than as an integrated whole. In this model, these various factors contribute simultaneously to the experience of love, and can be disconnected from each other.

Elaboration

Sternberg's triangular theory of love was developed after the identification of passionate love and companionate love. Passionate love is focused on the present at the onset of a relationship, while companionate love endures and grows over time with deep meanings in that relationship. Both are different kinds of love but are connected in relationships.

Passionate love is associated with strong feelings of love and desire for a specific person. This love is full of excitement and novelty. Passionate love is important in the beginning of the relationship and typically lasts 3-12 months. There is a chemical component to passionate love; those experiencing it enjoy an increase in the neurotransmitters phenylethylamine and oxytocin. There is empirical research, particularly from Panksepp linking love to the opioid circuit in the brain. These feelings are most commonly found in the most early stages of love.

Companionate love follows passionate love. Companionate love is also known as affectionate love. When a couple reaches this level of love, they feel mutual understanding and care for each other. This love is important for the survival of the relationship. This type of love comes later on in the relationship and requires a certain level of knowledge in each person in the relationship.

Sternberg created his triangle next. The triangle's points are intimacy, passion, and commitment.

Intimate love is the corner of the triangle that encompasses the close bonds of loving relationships. Intimate love felt between two people means that they each feel a sense of high regard for the other. They wish to make each other happy, share with each other, be in communication with each other, help when one is in need. Two people with intimate love deeply value each other. Intimate love has been called the "warm" love because of the way it brings two people close together. Sternberg predicted that intimacy levels would decline in longer relationships, but this was not borne out in a later study.

Passionate love is based on drive. Couples in passionate love feel physically attracted to each other. Sexual desire is typically a component of passionate love. Passionate love is not limited to sexual attraction, however. It is a way for couples to express feelings of nurture, dominance, submission, self-actualization, etc. Passionate love is considered the "hot" component of love because of the strong presence of arousal between two people. Sternberg believed that passionate love would diminish as the positive force of the relationship is taken over by opposite forces. This idea comes from Solomon's opponent-force theory. But the study mentioned earlier found this to be true only for females.

Commitment, or committed love, is that of lovers who are committed to being together for a long period of time. Something to note about commitment, however, is that one can be committed to someone without feeling love for him or her, and one can feel love for someone without being committed to him or her. Commitment is considered to be the "cold" love because it does not require either intimacy or passion. Sternberg believed that committed love increases in intensity as the relationship grows. Commitment can be present with friends as well.

Sternberg believed love to progress and evolve in predictable ways — that all couples in love will experience intimate, passionate, and committed love in the same patterns.

Although these types of love may contain qualities that exist in non-loving relationships, they are specific to loving relationships. A description of non-love is listed below, along with the other kinds of love. These kinds of love are combinations of one or two of the three corners of Sternberg's triangle of love.

Forms of love

The three components, pictorially labeled on the vertices of a triangle, interact with each other and with the actions they produce so as to form seven different kinds of love experiences (nonlove is not represented). The size of the triangle functions to represent the "amount" of love—the bigger the triangle, the greater the love. Each corner has its own type of love and provides different combinations to create different types of love and labels for them. The shape of the triangle functions to represent the "style" of love, which may vary over the course of the relationship:

Non love The absence of any of the three types of love. No connection. Indifferent to relationship. 
Liking/friendship This type of love is intimacy without passion or commitment. This includes friendships and acquaintances.
Infatuated love: Infatuated love is passion without intimacy or commitment. This is considered "puppy love" or relationships that have not become serious yet. Romantic relationships often start out as infatuated love and become romantic love as intimacy develops over time. Without developing intimacy or commitment, infatuated love may disappear suddenly.
Empty love is characterized by commitment without intimacy or passion. A stronger love may deteriorate into empty love. In an arranged marriage, the spouses' relationship may begin as empty love and develop into another form, indicating "how empty love need not be the terminal state of a long-term relationship ... [but] the beginning rather than the end".
Romantic love This love is passionate and intimate but has no commitment. This could be a romantic affair or a one-night stand.
Companionate love is an intimate, non-passionate type of love that is stronger than friendship because of the element of long-term commitment. "This type of love is observed in long-term marriages where passion is no longer present" but where a deep affection and commitment remain. The love ideally shared between family members is a form of companionate love, as is the love between close friends who have a platonic but strong friendship.
Fatuous love can be exemplified by a whirlwind courtship and marriage—it has points of passion and commitment but no intimacy. An example of this is "love at first sight".
Consummate love is the complete form of love, representing an ideal relationship which people strive towards. Of the seven varieties of love, consummate love is theorized to be that associated with the "perfect couple". According to Sternberg, these couples will continue to have great sex fifteen years or more into the relationship, they cannot imagine themselves happier over the long-term with anyone else, they overcome their few difficulties gracefully, and each delights in the relationship with the other. However, Sternberg cautions that maintaining a consummate love may be even harder than achieving it. He stresses the importance of translating the components of love into action. "Without expression," he warns, "even the greatest of loves can die." Thus, consummate love may not be permanent. If passion is lost over time, it may change into companionate love. Consummate love is the most satisfying kind of adult relation because it combines all pieces of the triangle into this one type of love. It is the ideal kind of relationship. This kind of relationship can be found over long periods of time or in idealistic relationships found in movies.
Sternberg's triangular theory of love provides a strong foundation for his later theory of love, entitled Love as a Story. In this theory, he explains that the large numbers of unique and different love stories convey different ways of how love is understood. He believes that over time this exposure helps a person determine what love is or what it should be to them. These two theories create Sternberg's duplex theory of love.

"Personal relationships that have the greatest longevity and satisfaction are those in which partners are constantly working on sustaining intimacy and reinforcing commitment to each other."

Support and criticism

In a study done by Michele Acker and Mark Davis in 1992, Sternberg's triangular theory of love was tested for validity. By studying a population that extended outside the typically studied group of 18- to 20-year-old college students, Acker and Davis were able to study more accurately the stages of love in people. Some criticism of Sternberg's theory of love is that although he predicted the stages of a person's love for another person, he did not specify a time or point in the relationship when the stages would evolve. He does not specify whether the different parts of love are dependent on duration of relationship or on the particular stage that relationship has reached. Acker and Davis point out that the stage and duration of the relationship are potentially important to the love component and explore them.

They find that there are no exact answers because not only each couple, but each individual in the couple experiences love in a different way. There are three perceptions of the triangular theory of love, or "the possibility of multiple triangles". Multiple triangles can exist because individuals can experience each component of love (or point of the triangle) more intensely than another. These separate triangles, according to Acker and Davis and many others, are 'real' triangles, 'ideal' triangles, and 'perceived' triangles.

These 'real' triangles are indicative of how each individual views the progress and depth of his or her relationship. The 'ideal' triangles are indicative of each individual's ideal qualities of his or her partner/relationship. The 'perceived' triangles are indicative of each individual's ideas of how his or her partner is viewing the relationship. If any of these three separate triangles do not look the same as a person's partner's triangles, dissatisfaction is likely to increase.

Love may not be as simple as Sternberg's triangular theory initially laid it out to be. Sternberg measured his theory on couples who were roughly the same age (mean age of 28) and whose relationship duration was roughly the same (4 to 5 years). His sample size was limited in characteristic variety. Acker and Davis announced this issue as being one of three major problems with Sternberg's theory. Romantic love, in particular, is not often the same in undergraduate level couples as couples who are not undergrads. Acker and Davis studied a sample that was older than Sternberg's sample of undergraduates. Sternberg himself did this in 1997.

The two other most obvious problems with Sternberg's theory of love are as follows. The first is the question of the separate nature of the levels of love. The second is a question of the measures that have been used to assess the three levels of love. These problems with the theory continued to be studied, for example by Lomas (2018).

In a large-scale cross-cultural study published in the Journal of Sex Research in 2020, the cultural universality of the theory was supported.

See also

 Carte de Tendre
 Love styles
 Lovemap
 Neuroanatomy of intimacy
 Psychological theories of love
 Scientific models of love
 Romantic friendship
 Theories of love

References

External links

Interpersonal attraction
Philosophy of love
Psychological theories